South Norfolk is a local government district in Norfolk, England.  Its council is based in Long Stratton. The population of the Local Authority District was 124,012 as taken at the 2011 Census.

History
The district was formed on 1 April 1974 under the Local Government Act 1972, as a merger of Diss Urban District, Wymondham Urban District, Depwade Rural District, Forehoe and Henstead Rural District and Loddon Rural District.

History of governance

The below table outlines the composition of South Norfolk Council from 1973 to 2019.

Recent elections

2019 saw the Conservatives lose five seats but retain overall control of the council. The boundaries used were new at this election and saw the Labour Party unexpectedly win a seat on the council for the first time since 2003 gaining Loddon (notionally) from the Conservatives.  Liberal Democrat group leader Trevor Lewis, standing in a much changed ward, was not re-elected.

[1] Others: Independents and UKIP.

Political composition
Elections are held every four years, with the last elections occurring in May 2019. The next elections are due to take place in May 2023. The composition of the council, after by-elections and defections, is as follows;

UK Youth Parliament

Although the UK Youth Parliament is an apolitical organisation, the elections are run in a way similar to that of the Local Elections. The votes come from 11 to 18 year olds and are combined to make the decision of the next, 2 year Member of Youth Parliament. The elections are run at different times across the country with South Norfolk's typically being in early Spring and bi-annually.

The current Member of Youth Parliament for South Norfolk is Ewan Brett MYP.

Wards & parishes

Geographical composition
The district is entirely parished, and is made up of 119 civil parishes. At the time of the 2001 census, the district had an area of 909 km², with a population of 110,710 in 46,607 households.

The district contains the following civil parishes:
 Alburgh, Aldeby, Alpington, Ashby St. Mary, Ashwellthorpe and Fundenhall, Aslacton
 Barford, Barnham Broom, Bawburgh, Bedingham, Bergh Apton, Bixley, Bracon Ash, Bramerton, Brandon Parva, Coston, Runhall and Welborne, Bressingham, Brockdish, Brooke, Broome, Bunwell, Burgh St. Peter, Burston and Shimpling
 Caistor St. Edmund, Carleton Rode, Carleton St. Peter, Chedgrave, Claxton, Colney, Costessey, Cringleford
 Denton, Deopham, Dickleburgh and Rushall, Diss, Ditchingham
 Earsham, East Carleton, Easton, Ellingham
 Flordon, Forncett (comprising Forncett St Mary and Forncett St Peter), Framingham Earl, Framingham Pigot
 Geldeston, Gillingham, Gissing, Great Melton, Great Moulton
 Haddiscoe, Hales, Heckingham, Hedenham, Hellington, Hempnall, Hethersett, Heywood, Hingham, Holverston, Howe
 Keswick and Intwood, Ketteringham, Kimberley, Kirby Bedon, Kirby Cane, Kirstead
 Langley with Hardley, Little Melton, Loddon, Long Stratton
 Marlingford and Colton,
 Morley, Morningthorpe and Fritton, Mulbarton, Mundham
 Needham, Newton Flotman, Norton Subcourse
 Poringland, Pulham Market, Pulham St. Mary
 Raveningham, Redenhall with Harleston, Rockland St. Mary, Roydon
 Saxlingham Nethergate, Scole, Seething, Shelfanger, Shelton and Hardwick, Shotesham, Sisland, Starston, Stockton, Stoke Holy Cross, Surlingham, Swainsthorpe, Swardeston
 Tacolneston, Tasburgh, Tharston and Hapton, Thurlton, Thurton, Thwaite, Tibenham, Tivetshall St Margaret, Tivetshall St. Mary, Toft Monks, Topcroft, Trowse with Newton,
 Wacton, Wheatacre, Wicklewood, Winfarthing, Woodton, Wortwell, Wramplingham, Wreningham, Wymondham
 Yelverton

Merger 
In October 2020, Private Eye reported a total of £594,000 was paid to two managers leaving South Norfolk council as a result of the merger of the management teams at South Norfolk and Broadland councils, which included £540,000 to outgoing chief executive Sandra Dinneen. (A further £357,000 in termination payments was to be shared between three managers leaving Broadland council due to the merger.) The councils stated these so-called "golden goodbyes" would save them money, as they would have fewer highly paid senior officials after they departed.

Neighbouring districts

Arms

References

External links
 Diss Express - district's local newspaper website

 
Non-metropolitan districts of Norfolk